Forenede Klubber i Viborg, more commonly known as FK Viborg is the youth academy of Viborg FF. FK Viborg consists of youth teams on under-18, under-16, under-14 and under-12 basis.

FK Viborg was founded in 2002 as a superstructure on Viborg FF, Overlund GF, Viborg B67, Viborg Søndermarken IK, Viborg Nørremarken and Houlkær IF's best youth teams.

Known academy players
Alexander Juel Andersen
 Ben Davies
Mathias Gertsen
Anders Holvad
Jeff Mensah
Kevin Mensah
Henrik Kappelborg
Carlos Shiralipour
Christian Stisen

External links
FK Viborg at Viborg FF's official website.

Football academies in Europe
2002 establishments in Denmark